The Self Portrait is a 1658 self portrait by Rembrandt, one of over 40 self-portraits by Rembrandt.  It was formerly owned by the Earl of Ilchester and is now in the Frick Collection in New York City.

External links

http://collections.frick.org/view/objects/asitem/items$0040:238

1658 paintings
Self-portraits by Rembrandt
Portrait paintings in the Frick Collection